Callimetopus irroratus is a species of beetle in the family Cerambycidae. It was described by Newman in 1842, originally under the genus Euclea. It is known from the Philippines.

Varietas
 Callimetopus irroratus var. albidus Breuning, 1947
 Callimetopus irroratus var. bifasciatus (Fisher, 1943)

References

Callimetopus
Beetles described in 1842